Gottwald is a surname. Notable people with the surname include:

Clytus Gottwald (1925–2023), German composer, conductor and musicologist
Felix Gottwald (born 1976), Austrian Nordic combined athlete who competed from 1994 to 2007
Frederick Gottwald (1858–1941), traditionalist American painter, influential in the development of the Cleveland School of art
George Joseph Gottwald (1914–2002), American Catholic bishop
Jeremiah Gottwald, fictional character in the Sunrise anime series, Code Geass: Lelouch of the Rebellion
Klement Gottwald (1896–1953), Czechoslovak Communist politician, prime minister and president of Czechoslovakia
Lukasz Sebastian Gottwald (born September 26, 1973), known as Dr. Luke, American record producer and songwriter
Michal Gottwald (born 1981), Slovak football forward who plays for FK Dukla Banská Bystrica in the Slovak Superliga
Norman K. Gottwald (born 1926), American biblical scholar and political activist
Peter Gottwald Jr., Paralympian athlete from America competing mainly in category T13 middle-distance events
Siegfried Gottwald (1943–2015), German mathematician, logician and historian of science

See also
Gottwald Center for the Sciences, on the campus of the University of Richmond
Order of Klement Gottwald, established by the Czechoslovak government in February 1953
List of places named after Klement Gottwald

Surnames from given names